Lurch/Butterfly Love is a compilation album by Steel Pole Bath Tub, released in 1990 by Boner Records.

Track listing

Personnel 
Adapted from the Butterfly Love liner notes.

Steel Pole Bath Tub
 Dale Flattum – bass guitar, sampler, vocals
 Mike Morasky – guitar, tape, vocals
 Darren Morey (as D.K. Mor-X) – drums

Production and additional personnel
 Steel Pole Bath Tub – production

References

External links 
 

1990 compilation albums
Boner Records albums
Steel Pole Bath Tub albums